The Kisan are a Hindu caste found in the state of Uttar Pradesh in India.  They are also known as Kisan Mahur and Mahato. They have been granted Other Backward Class status.

References

Social groups of Uttar Pradesh
Indian castes